may refer to:
 Haguroyama Masaji, a sumo wrestler who rose to yokozuna
 Haguroyama Sojō, a sumo wrestler and son-in-law of the former
 Mount Haguro (Haguro-san), Yamagata Prefecture, Japan, one of the sacred Three Mountains of Dewa.